The 2020 KDI Office Technology 200 was the 13th stock car race of the 2020 NASCAR Gander RV & Outdoors Truck Series season and the 21st iteration of the event. The race was originally to be held on May 1, 2020 but was postponed to August 21, 2020 due to the COVID-19 pandemic. The race was held in Dover, Delaware at Dover International Speedway, a  permanent oval-shaped racetrack. The race took the scheduled 200 laps to complete. At race's end, Zane Smith of GMS Racing would win the race after pulling away on a late race restart, the second of his career and the second of the season. To fill the podium, Matt Crafton of ThorSport Racing and Brett Moffitt of GMS Racing would finish second and third, respectively.

Background 

Dover International Speedway (formerly Dover Downs International Speedway) is a race track in Dover, Delaware, United States. Since opening in 1969, it has held at least two NASCAR races. In addition to NASCAR, the track also hosted USAC and the Verizon IndyCar Series. The track features one layout, a 1 mile (1.6 km) concrete oval, with 24° banking in the turns and 9° banking on the straights. The speedway was owned and operated by Dover Motorsports.

The track, nicknamed "The Monster Mile", was built in 1969 by Melvin Joseph of Melvin L. Joseph Construction Company, Inc., with an asphalt surface, but was replaced with concrete in 1995. Six years later in 2001, the track's capacity moved to 135,000 seats, making the track have the largest capacity of sports venue in the mid-Atlantic. In 2002, the name changed to Dover International Speedway from Dover Downs International Speedway after Dover Downs Gaming and Entertainment split, making Dover Motorsports. From 2007 to 2009, the speedway worked on an improvement project called "The Monster Makeover", which expanded facilities at the track and beautified the track. After the 2014 season, the track's capacity was reduced to 95,500 seats.

Entry list 

*Withdrew.

Starting lineup 
The starting lineup was based on a metric qualifying system based on the previous race, the 2020 Sunoco 159 and owner's points. As a result, Brett Moffitt of GMS Racing would win the pole.

Race results 
Stage 1 Laps: 45

Stage 2 Laps: 45

Stage 3 Laps: 110

References 

2020 NASCAR Gander RV & Outdoors Truck Series
NASCAR races at Dover Motor Speedway
August 2020 sports events in the United States
2020 in sports in Delaware